Alain Vernier (born 9 February 1968) is a retired Swiss football defender.

References

1968 births
Living people
Swiss men's footballers
SR Delémont players
Neuchâtel Xamax FCS players
FC Bulle players
FC St. Gallen players
FC Thun players
Association football defenders
Swiss Super League players